Transtillaspis parallela is a species of moth of the family Tortricidae. It is found in Peru.

The wingspan is about 21 mm. The ground colour of the forewings is brownish cream with brownish suffusions and darker lines. The hindwings are brownish grey.

Etymology
The species name refers to the parallel similarity of the characters with Transtillaspis obvoluta.

References

Moths described in 2010
Transtillaspis
Taxa named by Józef Razowski